Alvorada de Minas is a Brazilian municipality in the state of Minas Gerais.  its population is estimated to be 3,605. The city belongs to the mesoregion Metropolitana de Belo Horizonte and to the microregion of Conceição do Mato Dentro.

See also
 List of municipalities in Minas Gerais

References

Municipalities in Minas Gerais